Abu Thumama al-Ṣa'idi also known as Amribn Abd Allahibn Kaʿb (Arabic: عمر بن عبدالله بن کعب) was a prominent companion of Ali ibn Abi Talib and Hussain ibn Ali. He was one of the noblemen of Kufa who invited Hussain to Kufa. He participated in the Battle of Karbala and was killed there on the day of Ashura.

Life 
After Mu'awiya's death, he was among the people who gathered in the house of Sulaymanibn Surad al-Khuza'i to invite Hussian ib Ali to Kufa and he sent a letter to Mecca to him.

He was considered a great horse rider and was a prominent Shi'a in Kufa. While Muslimibn 'Aqil was in Kufa, he raised people's charity, managed financial affairs and bought weapons.

In the uprising of the people of Kufa against Ubayd Allahibn Ziyad, Muslimibn Aqil assigned Abu Thumama as the commander of the Tamim and Hamdan tribes.

Adopting the policy of bribing and terrifying the heads of important tribes, Ubayd Allah ibn Ziyad dispersed people from around Muslim ibn Aqil and killed him. After Muslimibn Aqil, Ubayd Allahibn Ziyad pursued Abu Thumama. He hid in his tribe for some days, then secretly left Kufa along with Nafi'ibn Hilal. He joined Hussain ibn Ali on his way from Mecca to Kufa and accompanied him to Karbala.

His actions on the day of Ashura included preventing Kathiribn 'Abd Allah al-Sha'bi, the herald of Umaribn Sa'd, from carrying his weapon before Hussain. At noon, he mentioned that the noon prayer's time had come, and Hussain ibn Ali asked Allah's blessing for him. After that, he continued fighting until he was killed.

References 

Husayn ibn Ali
Hussainiya
680 deaths
People killed at the Battle of Karbala
Year of birth missing